Jannatabad (also Romanized as Jannatābād; also known as Jannat) is a village in Sedeh Rural District, Sedeh District, Qaen County, South Khorasan Province, Iran. At the 2006 census, its population was 142, in 49 families.

References 

Populated places in Qaen County